Elaine Elizabeth Shepard (April 2, 1913 – September 6, 1998) was a Broadway and film actress in the 1930s and 1940s. She was also the author of The Doom Pussy, a semi-fictional account of aviation in the Vietnam War.

Film and stage
Shepard worked as a model on the West Coast before she became active in films. Her first film appearance was in the 1936 Republic serial Darkest Africa, in which she played Valerie Tremaine, the heroine of the film. This was followed with a series of leading roles in other minor films, such as You Can't Fool Your Wife, a 1940 comedy starring Lucille Ball. She then had several minor roles in major films, including playing a secretary in Topper and uncredited roles in Thirty Seconds Over Tokyo and the 1946 Ziegfeld Follies. A more prominent role came in Seven Days Ashore, a musical in which she plays the principal love interest for the band of sailors on shore leave.

Shepard's Broadway credits included performing in the ensemble in Nina Rosa (1931) and portraying Mildred Hunter in Panama Hattie (1940) and a maid in The Land Is Bright (1942).

Freelance journalism
Shepard abandoned acting and turned to freelance journalism, reporting from international trouble spots including the Congo and Northern Ireland. She interviewed international leaders, and in 1959 she was the only female reporter accredited to travel with President Dwight Eisenhower when he toured the Middle East. She is best known in this role for her Vietnam War coverage, which became the basis for her 1967 book The Doom Pussy, recounting her experiences with aviators in the early part of the war. This book includes use of the phrase "the whole nine yards", an old American colloquialism.

Personal life
Shepard was married to George Hartmann.

Films
 Darkest Africa (1936) - Valerie Tremaine
 I Cover Chinatown (1936) - Gloria Watkins
 Law of the Ranger (1937) - Evelyn Polk
 The Fighting Texan (1937) - Judy Walton
 Topper (1937) - Secretary
 Night 'n' Gales (1937) (an Our Gang short) - Mrs. Hood, Darla's mother
 Professor Beware (1938) - Anebi (uncredited)
 There Goes My Heart (1938) - Customer (uncredited)
 You Can't Fool Your Wife (1940) - Peggy
 The Falcon in Danger (1943) - Nancy Palmer
 Seven Days Ashore (1944) - Annabelle Rogers
 Thirty Seconds Over Tokyo (1944) - Girl in Officers' Club (uncredited)
 Ziegfeld Follies (1945) - Ziegfeld Girl (uncredited)
 Fiamme sulla laguna (Italian, 1951) - Patricia (Last appearance)

Books
Forgive Us Our Press Passes (Prentice-Hall, 1962)
The Doom Pussy (Trident Press, 1967)
The Doom Pussy II (Rockoon Press, 1992)

References

External links 

 

American film actresses
American stage actresses
American women journalists
American people of the Vietnam War
1913 births
1998 deaths
20th-century American actresses
American women in the Vietnam War
Women in warfare post-1945
Women war correspondents
20th-century American women writers
20th-century American writers
People from Olney, Illinois